"Petrouchka" is a song by French rapper Soso Maness in collaboration with PLK. The music is largely based on the Russian traditional folk song "Kalinka", a musical work by Russian composer Ivan Petrovitsj Larionov. The song reached number-one on the French Singles Charts and in Wallonia.

Charts

Weekly charts

Year-end charts

References

2021 singles
2021 songs
French-language songs
SNEP Top Singles number-one singles
Ultratop 50 Singles (Wallonia) number-one singles